Giovanni Badile (1379 - 1448/1451) was an Italian painter active in Verona.

He was born in Verona. He painted a signed altarpiece of the Madonna and Saints in a Verona Gallery. Records of him exist from 1418 to 1433. His great grandson Giovanni Antonio Badile was also a painter.

References

15th-century Italian painters
Italian male painters
Painters from Verona
Year of death unknown
1379 births